Yannick Beaucaine (born 1 July 1983), best known as Häzel, is a French-Brazilian music producer, based in Melbourne, Australia. He is most recognized for his Hip-Hop and R&B productions and produced one of the songs on Gallant's Grammy nominated album Ology.

Biography 
Yannick Beaucaine was born in Brazil from a Brazilian father and a French mother. He moved to Paris, France at the age of 15. His involvement with music started at an early age when his father would take him to work as a baby at the national radio station Cultura Fm in Brasilia, where he was operating as a radio host/disc jockey.

In 1998 Yannick enrolled at the Culinary Arts School of Paris where he studied during 4 years for a Professional bachelor's degree in Culinary Arts and 1 year for a Degree in Molecular Gastronomy- a period during where he discovered Hip-Hop music. At the age of 15 he found himself in immersed in the music of J-Dilla and Erick Sermon which inspired him to learn music production. His brother, DJ Delaze, taught him how to use a computer and particularly a software called Fasttracker 2 for DOS, which he used until 2003 to make music at an amateur level.

2003 marks a new era when he switched systems to an AKAI MPC3000. Unfortunately, one year later, working on his first paid project, Häzel lost his gear after the recording studio got robbed overnight, setting him back a whole year without being able to make music.

In 2004 Häzel returns to make music on a windows PC and stands out with his productions on the Myspace community, leading him to meet people such as Ebrahim Lakhani (Eebsofresh), Slakah the beatchild and Drake.

In 2005 he formed a duo called Zebrahim with Ebrahim Lakhani, together, they have been working on many independent projects but their first release didn't come out until 2011. Zebrahim – "In my heart I am" was considered to be one of the best independent records on its release date, reaching top charts of multiple independent websites such as bandcamp and is still critically acclaimed around the world today. The project was originally released to raise funds for cancer awareness and have reached ten thousand downloads on its release trimester only.

In 2006 two of his productions was selected by Beatchild's (Formerly Slakah The Beatchild) for his upcoming project "Soul Movement Vol.1" on legendary UK's record label BBE. Both tracks were featuring debuting artist Drake, only one of them made it to the final version of Soul Movement Vol.1. The track "Share" was also featured on Drake's Comeback Season, which was a stepping stone in his career. Being the first release under the OVO label, Featuring artists like Dwele, Little Brother, Trey Songz and Producers like J Dilla, Kanye West, Boi-1da and Häzel. Comeback Season was released in 2007.

After working on numerous projects and features, in 2011, he released two solo projects."Playground EP" – a self-produced vocalized project with a genre he calls " Porno-Romantic" which was released on Parisian label Favorite Recordings. "Playground EP" was featured on several media platforms such as MTV and on Apple's Japanese iTunes main page. On the same year he also released "The Lost Tapes", a collection of unreleased instrumentals and tracks featuring Drake, Eebsofresh and Beatchild. For many, The Lost Tapes is considered as a classic. It quickly gained the first position in sales on Bandcamp on its first week of release, pulling Häzel to the top 100 most influential producers on the planet. The Lost Tapes was re-released on Vinyl and Cassette in 2012 on New York based record label, The Beat Down.

In 2013 Häzel meets TFOX (Travis Fox) with who will create the producer duo "Grawlix"

In 2016 with the help of his brother he creates his own record label, SUPREME CRATE, on which they release the first official Grawlix project "We Are Grawlix". The vinyl release sold out its first original press of 500 copies during the first week of release.

In 2017 he is nominated for a Grammy for his participation on the production of Gallant's Ology record, Best Urban Contemporary Album of the year.

Discography

Studio albums 
 The Lost Tapes (12" , Cassette, Digital) The Beat Down (2011)
 We Are Grawlix (12", Digital) Supreme Crate, Word and sound (2016)

Singles & EPs 
 Playground (12" EP, Digital) Favorite Records (2011)
 Zebrahim – In my heart i am (Digital) ADAR (2011)
 Turn The Lights Off (Flexi, S/Sided,Ltd) The Beat Down (2013)
 Ebrahim – Daddy's Girl (Digital) ADAR (2019)

Production Credits 
 Drake – Comeback Season (Digital) October's Very Own (2007)
 Slakah The Beatchild – Soul Movement Vol 1 (CD, Digital) BBE ( 2008)
 Onra – 1.0.8 (LP, Digital) Favorite Recordings (2009)
 Mad Clown – Anything Goes (Digital) Starship Ent. (2011)
 Tokimonsta – RA.270 (Digital) Resident Advisor (2011)
 Union – Analogtronics (12", Digital) Fat Beats (2012)
 Gallant – Ology (LP, Digital) Warner Bros. (2016)

References

External links 
 https://soundcloud.com/hazeldizzy
 https://www.instagram.com/hazeldizzy/
 https://open.spotify.com/artist/2XuQe6qA4dziDhpLjxUzZx
 https://music.apple.com/us/artist/hazel/1056248892

Articles 
http://www.nektartech.com/hazel-nektar-impact-studio-one.html

1983 births
Living people
Musicians from Paris
Brazilian people of French descent
French record producers
Brazilian emigrants to France
Brazilian expatriates in Australia
Musicians from Melbourne